Marjoribanks is a surname and may refer to:

Charles Albany Marjoribanks (1794–), Scottish Liberal MP
David Robertson, 1st Baron Marjoribanks (né Marjoribanks 1797–1893), Scottish stockbroker and politician
Dudley Marjoribanks, 1st Baron Tweedmouth (1820–1894), Scottish businessman and politician
Edward Marjoribanks (disambiguation), several people
George Marjoribanks (died 1931), Scottish polo player and banker
Hugh Marjoribanks (born 1933)
James Marjoribanks (1911–2003), British diplomat and ambassador
Sir John Marjoribanks, 1st Baronet (1763–1833), Scottish MP and Lord Provost of Edinburgh
Norman Marjoribanks (1872–1939), Scottish civil servant

Other uses
Miss Marjoribanks, 1866 novel by Margaret Oliphant

See also
Marjoribanks baronets
Clan Marjoribanks